Colt is the surname of:

People

Individuals
 Alvin Colt (1916–2008), American costume designer
 Elizabeth Jarvis Colt (1826–1905), American businesswoman and philanthropist, widow and heir of Samuel Colt
 Ethel Barrymore Colt (1912-1977), American actress, producer, and singer
 Harry Colt (1869–1951), English golf-course architect
 James Colt (1932–2008), American lawyer and politician
 John C. Colt (1810–1842), American bookkeeping authority and murderer, brother of Samuel Colt
 Johnny Colt (born 1968), American bass guitarist
 Judah Colt (1761–1832), early settler of Erie County, Pennsylvania
 LeBaron Bradford Colt (1846–1924), U.S. Senator from Rhode Island and judge
 Marshall Colt (born 1948), former actor and currently a practicing psychologist
 Maximilian Colt (died after 1641), Flemish sculptor who emigrated to England and became the King's Master Carver
 Roswell L. Colt (1779-1856), American businessman
 Samuel Colt (1814–1862), American inventor and industrialist, founder of Colt's Patent Fire-Arms Manufacturing Company
 Samuel P. Colt (1852–1921), American industrialist and politician, nephew of Samuel Colt

Groups
Colt baronets
Colt family incest case, an Australian family discovered to have been engaging in four generations of incest

Fictional characters
Christopher Colt, protagonist of the Colt .45 (TV series)

See also
Colt (disambiguation)
Colt (given name)